The ITFA Best Female Playback Singer Award is given by the state government as part of its annual International Tamil Film Awards for Tamil  (Kollywood) films.

The list
Here is a list of the award winners and the films for which they won.

See also

 List of music awards honoring women
 Tamil cinema
 Cinema of India

References

Female Playback Singer
Film music awards
Music awards honoring women